Sphaerolobium linophyllum is a species of flowering plant in the family Fabaceae and is endemic to the south of Western Australia. It is a prostrate to ascending shrub with a few narrowly linear leaves and red, yellow and orange flowers.

Description

Taxonomy
This species of pea was first formally described in 1864 by George Bentham who gave it the name Roea linophylla in Stephan Endlicher's Enumeratio plantarum quas in Novae Hollandiae ora austro-occidentali ad fluvium Cygnorum et in sinu Regis Georgii collegit Carolus Liber Baro de Hügel from an unpublished description by Charles von Hügel of specimens collected near the Swan River. In 1864, Bentham changed the name to Sphaerolobium linophyllum in Flora Australiensis. The specific epithet (linophyllum) means "thread-leaved".

Distribution and habitat
Sphaerolobium linophyllum grows in sandy soils and is widespread in the Avon Wheatbelt, Esperance Plains, Geraldton Sandplains, Jarrah Forest, Mallee, Swan Coastal Plain and Warren bioregions of southern Western Australia and is listed as "not threatened" by the Government of Western Australia Department of Biodiversity, Conservation and Attractions.

References

linophyllum
Eudicots of Western Australia
Plants described in 1837
Taxa named by George Bentham